Xavier Vernetta i Gallart (Barcelona, 11 October 1956) is a Catalan professor of literature, literary critic, translator and writer.

He has a degree in Contemporary History and Catalan Philology from the University of Barcelona. He has published about a dozen narrative works in Catalan, covering genres such as short stories, novel for adults, the young adult novel or fairytale. In 2003 he received ex aequo the Premi de Narrativa de la Fundació Enciclopèdia Catalana Prize for his work Parlem d'amor, and in 2007, the Lleida Prize for País de llops. He has been translated work to Basque.

Published work 
Narrative
Ara sí que l'he feta bona!. Barcelona: Cruïlla, 1992 
Ai, que caic!. Barcelona: Cruïlla, 1995 
Roberluxtina i la reunió de les bruixes. Barcelona: Cruïlla, 1995 
Parlem d'amor. Barcelona: Proa, 2006
Novels
L'esbudellador de l'Eixample. Barcelona: Cruïlla, 1993 
L'home del jaguar blanc : les oportunitats de l'Albert Jofresa/1. Barcelona: La Magrana, 1997 
108.3 FM. Jocs de lluna : les oportunitats de l'Albert Jofresa/2. Barcelona: La Magrana, 1997 
Somni de Tànger. Barcelona: La Magrana, 1997 
Sense adreça coneguda. Barcelona: Barcanova, 1997 
N. de Néstor : les oportunitats de l'Albert Jofresa/3. Barcelona: La Magrana, 1998 
Serà de nit. Barcelona: La Magrana, 1999 
Francis X Jofresa. Barcelona: La Magrana, 2000 
Dies de pluja. Barcelona: Barcanova, 2003
De què tens por, Bonica?. Barcelona: Barcanova, 2009 
País de llops. Barcelona: Proa, 2010
Literary studies
Jocs textuals. La narració. Barcelona: La Magrana, 1997
Theatre
Equívoc : ho sento, amic. Barcelona: Associació d'Actors i Directors Professionals de Catalunya, 1992

References

External links 

Writers from Barcelona
Literary critics from Catalonia
University of Barcelona alumni
Translators from Catalan
Translators to Basque
Translators from Catalonia
1956 births
Living people